Events in the year 1941 in Colombia.

Incumbents
President: Eduardo Santos

Events
March 16 – 1941 Colombian parliamentary election: The Liberal Party obtains a majority in the Chamber of Representatives.

Births
March 28 – Jaime Pardo Leal, lawyer and politician (died 1987)

Deaths

References

1940s in Colombia